Zoë (born and nowadays known as Zoë Pollock, 19 January 1969, Peckham, London) is a British pop singer and songwriter, who had brief success in 1991 with two hit singles, "Sunshine on a Rainy Day", which climbed to number 4 on the UK Singles Chart, and "Lightning", which reached number 37 (and spent three weeks in the UK Top 40). Zoë has released three solo albums and five singles.

Career
She initially started her career in the mid-1980s, by auditioning for Jimi Cauty and Youth to be the lead singer for their band Brilliant. She began dating Youth, who would later produce her two solo albums.

Zoë released her debut single, "Sunshine On a Rainy Day", in late 1990, with two different music videos. It failed to reach the UK Top 40. However, it was remixed and re-released in 1991 and it became a Top 10 hit, peaking at number 4. Her début album, Scarlet Red and Blue (to which singer Sam Brown contributed) included "Sunshine on a Rainy Day" and another moderately popular song, "Lightning", which peaked and spent a respectable three weeks at number 37 on the UK Singles Chart. The album, despite good promotion and reviews, however, did not sell well, reaching only number 67 on the UK Albums Chart. It featured similar dance-pop tracks as well as soulful ballads.  Soulful vocalists Sam Brown and Yazz both provided backing-vocals on the album.  "Holy Days" was the last single from Scarlet Red and Blue, released in February 1992, but only managed number 72. In 1991, Zoë sang backing vocals on Bananarama's Pop Life album, which was produced by Youth.

In 1996, Zoë re-emerged (still signed to M&G Records) with a revamped image, style and sound. Her new album, Hammer, was American rock. The title track was released as a single, but failed to reach the UK Singles Chart. After this album she disappeared from the music scene for several years, travelling around the world and becoming a sculptor and potter.

Zoë recorded an EP under the alias Hephzibah Broom, released by an independent Manchester label. Zoë became part of the female folk duo Mama, with singer Sarah McQuaid. They released their debut album, Crow Coyote Buffalo, in late 2008. The album includes a folk re-recording of Zoë's signature song, "Sunshine on a Rainy Day", which the group also made a music video for.

In 2021, Zoë released Lago Ausente, an album of original songs that celebrate her love of nature and plant medicine. Produced by Liam Fletcher, the album features guest performances by guitarists Fabiano do Nascimento and Sebastian Juliussen, percussionist Ricardo ‘Tiki’ Pasillas, shakuhachi player Adrian Freedman, violinist Bridget O’Donnell, cellist Julia Morneweg and double bassist Misha Mullov-Abbado, plus Fletcher himself on harmonium and synthesiser.

Discography

Albums

Singles

Personal life
Zoë moved to Cornwall and in 1998 married Murray Lachlan Young, a British poet. They have two children, and divorced in 2009.

References

1969 births
Living people
English songwriters
English women pop singers
People from Peckham
Singers from London